Danangsyah Yudistira Pribadi (born 12 May 1995) is an Indonesian beach volleyball player from Dompu Regency, West Nusa Tenggara.  In 2018, Pribadi alongside Gilang Ramadhan won a bronze medal at the 2018 Asian Games in Palembang, Indonesia.

References

External links
 
 

1995 births
Living people
People from Dompu Regency
Sportspeople from West Nusa Tenggara
Indonesian beach volleyball players
Asian Games bronze medalists for Indonesia
Asian Games medalists in beach volleyball
Medalists at the 2018 Asian Games
Beach volleyball players at the 2018 Asian Games
Competitors at the 2019 Southeast Asian Games
Southeast Asian Games gold medalists for Indonesia
Southeast Asian Games medalists in volleyball
20th-century Indonesian people
21st-century Indonesian people